Hopewell Rosenwald School is a historic Rosenwald school located near Clarks Hill in McCormick County, South Carolina.  It was built in 1926–1927, and is a One Teacher Community Plan school consisting of two smaller rooms and one large room.

It was listed on the National Register of Historic Places in 2010.

References

Rosenwald schools in South Carolina
African-American history of South Carolina
School buildings on the National Register of Historic Places in South Carolina
School buildings completed in 1927
Buildings and structures in McCormick County, South Carolina
National Register of Historic Places in McCormick County, South Carolina
1927 establishments in South Carolina